Filippo Alongi (born 27 April 2000) is an Italian rugby union player.
His usual position is as a Prop and he currently plays for Benetton in United Rugby Championship.

Selected for F.I.R. Academy squad, in 2018–19 Pro14 season, Alongi was named like Additional Player for Zebre. Under contract with Mogliano in Top10, from 2019 to 2022, he was also named as Permit Player for Benetton.

In 2019 and 2020, Alongi was named in the Italy Under 20 squad.  On the 14 October 2021, he was selected by Alessandro Troncon to be part of an Italy A 28-man squad for the 2021 end-of-year rugby union internationals and on 8 December he was named in Emerging Italy 27-man squad also for the 2021 end-of-year rugby union internationals.
On the 14 March 2022, he was selected by Kieran Crowley to be part of an Italy squad for the 2022 Six Nations Championship. He made his debut against Wales.

References

External links 
It's Rugby France Profile
Eurosport Profile

Italian rugby union players
2000 births
Living people
Rugby union props
Zebre Parma players
Mogliano Rugby players
Benetton Rugby players
Italy international rugby union players